Table tennis at the 2019 African Games was held from 20 to 29 August 2019 in Rabat, Morocco.

The event served as a qualifier for the 2020 Summer Olympics in Tokyo, Japan.

Participating nations

Medal table

Medalists

Men

Women

Mixed

References

External links
Results book (Archived)
Results

2019 African Games
African Games
2019 African Games
Table tennis at the African Games